Winter in Tokyo is a 2016 Indonesian romance film directed by Fajar Bustomi and adapted from one of four season tetralogy novels by Ilana Tan. Shooting location is on Japan. The film was released on 11 August 2016.

Cast
Pamela Bowie as Ishida Keiko
Dion Wiyoko as Nishimura Kazuto
Kimberly Ryder as Yuri
Morgan Oey as Kitano Akira
Ferry Salim as Shinzo
Brandon Nicholas Salim as Tomoyuki
Brigitta Cynthia as Haruka

References

2016 films
Indonesian romantic drama films
Films based on Indonesian novels
Films directed by Fajar Bustomi